The 2011 Temple Owls football team represented Temple University in the 2011 NCAA Division I FBS football season. The Owls were led by first-year head coach Steve Addazio and played their home games at Lincoln Financial Field. They played as a member of the East Division of the Mid-American Conference. They finished the season 9–4, 5–3 in MAC play to finish in second place in the East Division. They were invited to the New Mexico Bowl where they defeated Wyoming 37–15. It was the school's first bowl win since the 1979 Garden State Bowl. This was the Owls' last season as a member of the MAC as they re-joined the Big East Conference for football in 2012.

Schedule

References

Temple
Temple Owls football seasons
New Mexico Bowl champion seasons
Temple Owls football